Welcker is a German surname. Notable people with the surname include:

Caius Welcker (1885–1939), a Dutch footballer  
Carl Theodor Welcker (1790–1869), German jurist and politician
Carola Giedion-Welcker (1893–1979) German-Swiss art historian
Friedrich Gottlieb Welcker (1784–1868), German philologist and archaeologist  
Gertrude Welcker (1896–1988), German silent film actress 
Hermann Welcker (1822–1897), German anatomist

Other uses
13718 Welcker, main-belt asteroid
Welcker volcano, the highest volcanic peak in the Garbuna Group
Welker

German-language surnames